Guisachan Fall is a waterfall of Scotland. Known locally as Home Falls, they are located near to the ruins of Guisachan House, and can be accessed by a path which runs next to the Allt na Sidhean river. The remains of a hydro system which once powered the house are found at the base of the falls, and the iron rings which once held the water pipe can still be seen in the rock face. Spanning the top of the falls are the remains of a wrought iron footbridge. This is very similar to the one which previously stood at the top of Plodda Falls, but more ornate. A sluice system which would have been used to divert water from Plodda can still be seen just behind the top of the falls.

See also
Waterfalls of Scotland

References

Waterfalls of Scotland